Curtis Cordell Barclay (August 22, 1931 – March 25, 1985) was an American professional baseball player. In his only full season in MLB, in 1957, he was a member of the pitching staff of the final Giants team to represent New York, working in 37 games, 28 as a starting pitcher, and posting a 9–9 won–lost record. His 3.44 earned run average led Giants' starters and he pitched two shutouts, back-to-back blankings of the Brooklyn Dodgers (August 6) and Philadelphia Phillies (August 11). They would be the only shutouts of Barclay's MLB career.

He posted 19, 16, and 15-win seasons in three seasons of minor league baseball, losing 11 games as well each year, before joining the Giants as a rookie in 1957.

However, that would be Barclay's only full year with the Giants. Hampered by a sore shoulder, he split the 1958 and 1959 seasons between San Francisco and its top farm club, the Phoenix Giants, and he retired after the 1960 minor league campaign.  Barclay's final Major League record was 10–9 (3.48) with 73 strikeouts and 55 bases on balls in 199 innings, allowing 214 hits. He registered five complete games and one save.

Barclay died from cancer at age 53 in Missoula, Montana.

References

External links

1931 births
1985 deaths
Baseball players from Chicago
Dallas Eagles players
Danville Leafs players
Deaths from cancer in Montana
Knoxville Smokies players
Major League Baseball pitchers
Minneapolis Millers (baseball) players
New York Giants (NL) players
Oregon Ducks baseball players
Oregon Ducks men's basketball players
Phoenix Giants players
San Francisco Giants players
Sioux City Soos players
Tacoma Giants players
University of Oregon alumni
Vancouver Mounties players
American men's basketball players